Luminate (formerly Nielsen SoundScan, Nielsen Music Products, and MRC Data) is a provider of music sales data. Established by Mike Fine and Mike Shalett in 1991, data is collected weekly and made available every Sunday (for albums sales) and every Monday (for songs sales) to subscribers, which include record companies, publishing firms, music retailers, independent promoters, film and TV companies, and artist managers. It is the source of sales information for the Billboard music charts. It is owned by PMRC, a joint venture between Eldridge Industries (publisher of Billboard) and Penske Media Corporation.

The company operates the analytics platform Music Connect, Broadcast Data Systems (which tracks airplay of music), and Music 360.

History 
Nielsen SoundScan began tracking sales data for Nielsen on March 1, 1991.  The May 25 issue of Billboard published Billboard 200 and Country Album charts based on SoundScan "piece count data," and the first Hot 100 chart to debut with the system was released on November 30, 1991. Previously, Billboard tracked sales by calling stores across the U.S. and asking about sales—a method that was inherently error-prone and open to outright fraud. Indeed, while transitioning from the calling to tracking methods, the airplay and sales charts (already monitored by Nielsen) and the Hot 100 (then still using the calling system) often did not match (for instance Paula Abdul's "Promise of a New Day" and Roxette's "Fading Like a Flower" reached much higher Hot 100 peaks than their actual sales and airplay would have allowed them to).
Although most record company executives conceded that the new method was far more accurate than the old, the chart's volatility and its geographical balance initially caused deep concern, before the change and the market shifts it brought about were accepted across the industry. Tower Records, the country's second-largest retail chain, was originally not included in the sample because its stores were equipped with different technology to measure sales.
At first, some industry executives complained that the new system—which relied on high-tech sales measurement rather than store employee estimates—was based on an inadequate sample, one that favored established and mainstream acts over newcomers.

The Recording Industry Association of America also tracks sales (or more specifically, shipments minus potential returns) on a long-term basis through the RIAA certification system; it has never used either Nielsen SoundScan or the store-calling method.

The first Billboard Hot 100 number-one song via Nielsen SoundScan was "Set Adrift on Memory Bliss" by P.M. Dawn.

Other changes would also largely impact the Hot 100 in the future, consisting of radio-only songs being able to chart in 1998, and YouTube views playing part of how a Hot 100 is decided in 2013.

In December 2019, Eldridge Industries' Valence Media, the current parent company of Billboard, acquired Nielsen's music data business, reuniting it with Billboard for the first time since its spin-off to E5 Global Media from Nielsen Business Media. It was renamed MRC Data in 2020 after Eldridge Industries merged Valence with the film and television studio MRC. and was then brought under its PMRC joint venture with Penske Media Corporation as P-MRC Data. It was renamed once more to Luminate Data in March 2022. In August 2022, the MRC merger was unwound, with Eldridge Industries taking sole ownership of its stake in PMRC.

Tracking
Sales data from cash registers is collected from 14,000 retail, mass merchant, and non-traditional (on-line stores, venues, digital music services, etc.) outlets in the United States, Canada, UK and Japan.

The requirements for reporting sales to Nielsen Music are that the store has Internet access and a point of sale (POS) inventory system. Submission of sales data must be in the form of a text file consisting of all the UPCs sold and the quantities per UPC on a weekly basis. Sales collected from Monday-Sunday or Sunday-Saturday are reported every Monday and made available to subscribers every Wednesday. Anyone selling a music product with its own UPC or ISRC may register that product to be tracked by Luminate.

Sales calculation
Not all retailers participate in the SoundScan program, so total CD sales are projected from the collected data using a statistical calculation called "weighting". This assigns a multiplier to each category of stores, to compensate for the number of similar stores not covered by the sampling program. Sales in each category are multiplied accordingly.

Such a system is vulnerable to exploitation if it is known which stores are included in the sampling program. To inflate their reported chart sales, some indie labels were reported to purposefully target stores in the program for on-site sales promotions. Also, other labels were found shipping boxes of their CDs to be scanned by complicit retailers in the program.

Impact
The incorporation of SoundScan tracking by the Billboard charting system was cited by the industry as a possible cause of the early '90s popularization of alternative music in the United States. An explanation floated was that the previous call system under-represented marginal genres. Under SoundScan, more accurate data on alternative music sales allowed these acts to appear higher in the Billboard charts than before, and their chart success helped increase the genre's popularity. In addition, SoundScan sales data quickly found use in the promotion departments at major record labels, to persuade radio station music directors to play tracks by high-selling alternative artists such as Nirvana.

See also
 Album era
 Music recording certification
 List of best-selling albums in the United States of the Nielsen SoundScan era
 List of number-one Billboard Blues Albums of the 1990s
 DigiListan – Swedish radio programme using Nielsen SoundScan to create its statistics

References

External links
 Nielsen Music Sales Measurement (formerly SoundScan)

Distribution (marketing)
Market research organizations
Mass media companies established in 1991
Entertainment companies established in 1991
American companies established in 1991
American music industry